Westborough High School is a public high school in Westborough, Massachusetts, United States that serves as the high school for the Westborough Public School District. The school's mascot is the Ranger and the school colors are cardinal and navy blue. In the 2017–18 school year, WHS had an enrollment of 1131 students. The school is located in the downtown Westborough area at 90 West Main Street.

History

Previous locations 
The first public school in Westborough was on Science Hill on School Street. The school eventually became graded and graduated its first class of three in 1872.

Property history
In the mid-1800s, box factory and hotel owner Christopher Whitney built a mansion on the site. The property was sold in 1920 to the Aronson cattle dealers who hosted regular cattle auctions on the site.

Two infamous events have occurred on the property that was to become Westborough High School. This first was the capturing of the five Rice boys by the Canawaugha Indian tribe from present day Canada. The second was the 1953 tornado that struck the Aronson property and fields, killing three of the Aronsons and a hired man.

Academics

Standardized test scores
On the 2013 MCAS test, sophomores at Westborough High School ranked 105 of 354 schools in English, 59 of 354 in math, and 15 of 344 in science and technology. The school had 97% of test takers place in the advanced or proficient categories in English, compared to the state average of 91%. In math, this percentage was 92% compared to the state's 90%, and a 94% in science and technology compared to the state average of 71%.

Advanced Placement Courses
Westborough High School offers AP courses in microeconomics, computer science, 3D design portfolio, studio art 2D, music theory, calculus AB, calculus BC, statistics, biology, chemistry, United States history, French, Spanish, and English literature
and allows its students to take AP courses through the Virtual High School program. 59.6% of students at WHS take at least one AP course before they graduate.

Honor societies
Westborough High School has an active chapter of the National Honor Society, which meets monthly. The NHS chapter runs a free tutoring service available to all Westborough public school attendees.

Athletics

Fine arts
Westborough offers the following curricular music ensembles:
String orchestra
Concert band
Symphonic band
Mixed chorus
Women’s chorale
Concert choir
Full Orchestra

The following extracurricular ensembles run outside of class time:
Honors string quartet
String chamber ensemble
Marching band
Repertoire jazz band
Festival jazz band
Saxophone quartet
Woodwind quintet
Percussion ensemble
Harmony in Heels (Girls' a cappella)
Don't Panic (Mixed a cappella)
Member’s Only (Boys' a cappella)
Double Take (Girls' a cappella)
Chamber singers

Honor societies
Westborough High School’s chapter of the Tri-M Music Honor Society is chapter 3311.

Theater
Center Stage, the Westborough High School theater group, puts on three shows per academic year: a play in November, a musical in March, and a small piece or One Act festival in May.

References

Buildings and structures in Westborough, Massachusetts
Public high schools in Massachusetts
Schools in Worcester County, Massachusetts